Aaron ibn Sargado or Aaron ben R. Joseph ha-Kohen (Hebrew: אהרן הכהן בן יוסף - כלף סרג'דו) was a tenth-century AD gaon (Jewish religious leader) in Pumbedita, Babylonia. He was a son of Joseph ha-Kohen.

Biography

According to the chronicle of Sherira, Sargado was gaon from 943 to 960; others declare he died in 942. He was successor to the gaon Hananiah, the father of Sherira.

Rav Shrira continues to note that Rabbi Ahron HaKohen was not of a family of scholars, but of wealthy merchants; he was elevated to the gaonate (presidency of a rabbinical academy) through the influence of his family. Caleb ibn Sargado, the determined opponent of Saadia, who spent 60,000 zuzim in order to bring about the deposition of the gaon of Sura, was probably identical with Aaron, as Abraham Harkavy has shown.

Rabbinic writings

Four of Sargado's legal decisions on religious problems are preserved, and are printed in the collection, "Ḥemdah Genuza," Nos. 37–40. One of these, it appears, was the answer to an inquiry from Kairouan.

Like his opponent Saadia Gaon, Aaron was a Bible commentator, and parts of his commentary are extant in St. Petersburg. Abraham ibn Ezra quotes some of his philosophical sayings.

References

 Its bibliography:
Joel Müller, Mafteaḥ, 1891, p. 177;
Adolf Neubauer, Mediœval Jewish Chronicles i. 66, 92, 190;
Zunz, in Geiger's Jüd. Zeit. iv. 389;
Winter and Wünsche, Jüdische Literatur, ii. 247;
Geiger, Jüd. Zeit. i. 297.

External links
 Rav Ahron ben Yosef HaKohen Gaon at kehuna.org

Year of birth unknown
Year of death unknown
10th-century deaths
10th-century rabbis
Bible commentators
Geonim
Kohanim writers of Rabbinic literature
Rabbis of Academy of Pumbedita